The Gilbert–Sinton Historic District is an area in the southern portion of the Walnut Hills neighborhood of Cincinnati, Ohio, United States.

Most of the district was created by a small group of real estate developers working in conjunction with each other.  As a result, none of the present buildings were constructed before 1880, and little construction occurred after the turn of the 20th century.  Additionally, the architecture is relatively homogenous: most of the buildings are large residences constructed as homes for the wealthy, and the architectural styles exhibited in the district (which is predominantly Queen Anne and Shingle style) feature similar components and designs.

In its early years, life in the present-day Gilbert–Sinton neighborhood was accompanied by plentiful amenities.  When public transportation was initially established in the area, its first route ran along Sinton Avenue, and Cincinnati's first cable car line used Gilbert Avenue.  Neighborhoods all along this pioneer cable car route expanded rapidly, and Gilbert–Sinton was no exception.  Even today, the impact of these early public transportation routes is evident in the neighborhood.  Residents did not need to travel for entertainment; besides being the district's southern boundary, Morris Street is the northern boundary of the large Eden Park.

In 1983, the Gilbert–Sinton neighborhood was named a historic district and listed on the National Register of Historic Places.  Eighty-seven of the district's ninety buildings were counted as contributing properties.  Among these properties are the Gilbert Row along Gilbert Avenue and a pair of buildings known as Madam Fredin's Eden Park School and Neighboring Row House on Morris Street, which had already been listed on the National Register in 1982 and 1979 respectively.

See also
 Streetcars in Cincinnati

References

Historic districts in Cincinnati
National Register of Historic Places in Cincinnati
Queen Anne architecture in Ohio
Shingle Style architecture in Ohio
Historic districts on the National Register of Historic Places in Ohio